Thomas Danter (1 December 1922 – September 1980) was a Welsh rugby union, and professional rugby league footballer who played in the 1940s and 1950s.

Background
Tom Danter was born in Bridgend district, Wales.

International honours
Danter won 5 caps for Wales in 1949–1951 while at Hull.

References

1922 births
1980 deaths
Cardiff RFC players
Hull F.C. players
Hull Kingston Rovers players
Rugby league players from Bridgend
Rugby union players from Bridgend
Place of death missing
Rugby league props
Wales national rugby league team players
Welsh rugby league players
Welsh rugby union players